Mohamed-Slim Alouini is a Distinguished Professor of Electrical and Computer Engineering at King Abdullah University of Science and Technology (KAUST), Thuwal, Makkah Province, Saudi Arabia. His research interests include the modeling, design, and performance analysis of wireless, satellite, and optical communication systems. He is a fellow of the Institute of Electrical and Electronics Engineers (IEEE) and OPTICA (formerly known as the Optical Society of America (OSA).

Early life and education 
He was born in Tunis, Tunisia. In 1993, he obtained the Diplome d'Ingenieur, École Nationale Supérieure des Télécommunications and Diplome d'Etudes Approfondies (DEA) in Electronics in Télécom Paris and Université Pierre et Marie Curie in Paris, France respectively. In 1995, he receive the Masters of Sciences in Electrical Engineering (MSEE) from the Georgia Institute of Technology, Atlanta in United States and in 1998 he obtained his PhD in Electrical Engineering from the California Institute of Technology (Caltech), Pasadena, California, United States.

Career 
He joined King Abdullah University of Science and Technology (KAUST) in 2009 as a founding professor. He had served as a faculty member from 1998 to 2004 in the University of Minnesota, Minneapolis, Minnesota, United States. He also worked in the Texas A & M University at Qatar, Education City, Doha between 2004 and 2009.

Fellowship and membership 
He is a 2022 Fellow of the World Wireless Research Forum (WWRF), The World Academy of Science (TWAS), 2021 Fellow of Asia-Pacific Artificial Intelligence Association (AAIA), OPTICA (formerly known as the Optical Society of America (OSA), 2019 Member of the Academia Europaea (AE), the European Academy of Science and Arts (EASA), 2018 Fellow of the African Academy and Science (AAS), and 2009 Fellow of the Institute of Electrical and Electronics Engineers (IEEE).

Awards 
He received the UNSECO TWAS Award in Engineering Sciences in 2022, IEEE Communications Society Education Award in 2021, TAKREEM Foundation Award in the “Scientific & Technological Achievement” Category in 2021, NSP Obada Prize (Supported by the African Academy of Sciences) in 2021, Kuwait Prize in Applied Sciences in 2020, IEEE Vehicular Technology Society James Evans Avant Garde Award in 2020, IEEE Communication Society Communication Theory Technical Committee (CTTC) Achievement Award in 2019, Inaugural Organization of Islamic Cooperation (OIC) Science, Technology, & Innovation Achievement Award in Engineering Sciences, Astana, Kazhakstan in 2017, Abdul Hameed Shoman Award for Arab Researchers in Engineering Sciences, Amman, Jordan in 2016, IEEE Communication Society Wireless Communications Technical Committee (WTC) Recognition Award in 2016. He is also co-recipient of best paper/poster/video awards/prizes in 22 journals/conferences/challenges. He received university-level awards at the University of Minnesota (McKnight Land-Grant Professorship - 2001), Texas A&M University at Qatar (TAMU-Q Faculty Excellence Award - 2009) , and KAUST (CEMSE Faculty Service Award - 2016). He received in 1999 (i) National Science Foundation (NSF) CAREER Award and (ii) Charles Wilts Prize for outstanding independent research leading to a PhD in Electrical Engineering at the California Institute of Technology (Caltech).

References 

Tunisian educators
Tunisian engineers
Fellow Members of the IEEE
Fellows of the African Academy of Sciences
Year of birth missing (living people)
Living people
TWAS fellows